Stonehaven railway station serves the town of Stonehaven in Aberdeenshire, Scotland, United Kingdom. It is sited  from Carlisle via Perth, on the Dundee to Aberdeen line, and is situated between Laurencekirk and Portlethen. There is a crossover at the southern end of the station, which can be used to facilitate trains turning back if the line towards Aberdeen is blocked.

History 

The station was opened as part of the Aberdeen Railway on 1 November 1849. This later became part of the Scottish North Eastern Railway and then the Caledonian Railway.

In 1899, work started to improve the station. The platforms were raised, widened, and extended southward over the bridge to the south of the station. The buildings on the down platform were also replaced.

The station previously had a third platform, a bay facing north. The land where this once stood is now used as parking. There was also a station building on the northbound platform which has since been demolished.

On 12 August 2021, one year after the Stonehaven derailment occurred at Carmont, southwest of Stonehaven railway station, a plaque was unveiled dedicated to the three people killed in the derailment.

Stonehaven also has a B listed signal box with a 40 lever Stevens and Sons frame.

Facilities 
The station is equipped with a ticket office and an accessible toilet on platform 1, with help points, benches and waiting rooms on both platforms, as well as car parks adjacent to both platforms. Platform 2 also has a ticket machine. Both platforms have step-free access to their car parks, but they are linked by a stepped subway.

Passenger volume 

The statistics cover twelve month periods that start in April.

Services

Trains on both the Edinburgh to Aberdeen Line and the Glasgow to Aberdeen Line call here, though some services to and from Glasgow skip this station outside peak periods. Four London North Eastern Railway services also call each way Mondays - Saturdays (three to/from London King's Cross, the other to/from ), along with the two CrossCountry services between Aberdeen and Plymouth/Edinburgh. The Caledonian Sleeper also operates to London Euston six days per week (not on Saturday nights).

Service frequencies to the station were improved in 2018 as part of a revised timetable funded by Transport Scotland.

References

Bibliography

External Links 

 Video footage of the station on YouTube

Railway stations in Aberdeenshire
Former Caledonian Railway stations
Railway stations in Great Britain opened in 1849
Railway stations served by ScotRail
Railway stations served by Caledonian Sleeper
Railway stations served by CrossCountry
Railway stations served by London North Eastern Railway
Stonehaven
1849 establishments in Scotland
Listed railway stations in Scotland
Category C listed buildings in Aberdeenshire